Port Aggregation Protocol (PAgP) is a Cisco Systems proprietary networking protocol, which is used for the automated, logical aggregation of Ethernet switch ports, known as an EtherChannel. The PAgP is proprietary to Cisco Systems. A similar protocol known as LACP — released by the IEEE and known as 802.3ad or 802.1ax recently  — is an industry standard and is not tied to a specific vendor.

PAgP messages are always sent to the well known Cisco multicast address 01-00-0C-CC-CC-CC with protocol type code 0x0104. PAgP uses the same multicast group MAC address of CDP.

Cisco implementation
PAgP can be configured on a Cisco switch to operate in three different modes:
 auto - passive negotiation of the channel
 desirable - active negotiation of the channel
 on - no protocols are used: it assumes the other side has enabled link aggregation.

On Cisco network devices running CatOS, a single switch module may only be configured to run in either LACP or PAgP modes.  Cisco devices that run IOS (native and/or non-hybrid mode boxes) support individual port configuration for LACP and are not restricted to per module settings as with CatOS.

Limitations
A limitation of Port Aggregation Protocol is that all the physical ports in the aggregation group must reside on the same switch. Cisco's 6500 and the 4500E platforms, remove this limitation using Virtual Switching System (VSS), which allows port channels to be split between two chassis.

Advantages
With Port Aggregation Protocol "the line speed of an agport is the total of the line speeds of each of its physical ports." This does not automatically mean that a single transfer will use all of the aggregated interfaces bandwidth; rather, this depend on the distribution method of choice. Most Cisco switches use src/dst MAC address hash as distribution method, meaning that a single session will use the bandwidth of a single interface. Other Cisco switches uses a proprietary distribution method which enable true frame round-robin, enabling maximum link speed to be the same as the sum of the interfaces composing the aggregation group. This mean packet order can be altered, however.

Plain EtherChannel load-balancing works by having the switch assign a hash result from 0-7 based on the configured hash method (load-balancing algorithm) for the type of traffic. This hash result is commonly called a Result Bundle Hash (RBH).  They are then divided out over the available links. Therefore, no single flow can exceed the speed of a physical port. However, some PagP-enabled switches can negotiate between a "maximize load balancing" and "preserve ordering" link: the former give maximum aggregated bandwidth at the expense of packet ordering, while the latter assures no packet reordering to occur but limit a single transfer to the bandwidth of a single interface.

References

External links
Cisco Systems documentation

Ethernet
Link protocols
Cisco Systems
Cisco protocols
Bonding protocols